The 2020 ARCA Menards Series West was the sixty-seventh season of the ARCA Menards Series West, a regional stock car racing series sanctioned by NASCAR. It began on February 20 at the Las Vegas Motor Speedway Bullring with the Star Nursery 150, and ended on November 6 at Phoenix Raceway with the Arizona Lottery 100.

2020 marked the first season of this series under the ARCA banner.

When the season was put on hold due to the COVID-19 pandemic, drivers from all NASCAR series, including a few ARCA Menards series drivers, participated in the inaugural eNASCAR iRacing Pro Invitational Series during that time.

Teams and drivers

Complete schedule

Limited schedule

Notes

Changes

Teams
 On August 14, 2019, longtime West Series team Jefferson Pitts Racing announced that they would be splitting up into two teams, with Jeff Jefferson owning Jefferson Racing (and the new No. 42 car) and Jerry Pitts owning JP Racing (and the previously existing No. 7 car). This continues into 2020, with both teams running part-time schedules.
 Bill McAnally Racing announced that they would be fielding four full-time teams in 2020 (up from three in 2019), with their No. 50 Toyota, previously a part-time car, running full-time in 2020 along with the Nos. 16, 19, and 99. However, on January 31, 2020, they announced a fifth full-time car, the No. 12, for Lawless Alan, who drove the same car part-time last season. This brings BMR up to five full-time teams for five rookie drivers.
 Venturini Motorsports will field a West Series team for the first time in 2020, with Corey Heim driving a car for them at Sonoma and the season-finale at Phoenix (as well as three races in the ARCA East Series and two in the big ARCA Menards Series).

Drivers
 On January 14, 2020, Bill McAnally Racing announced their 2020 driver lineup, with all four of their drivers new to the team and running for rookie of the year. 
 Gio Scelzi replaces 2019 champion Derek Kraus in the No. 16, who moves to the Truck Series full-time with the team.
 Jesse Love replaces Hailie Deegan in the No. 19, who left BMR and Toyota's driver development program to compete in the 20-race ARCA Menards Series with DGR-Crosley as well as join Ford's driver development program.
 Holley Hollan will drive the No. 50 full-time, which was run part-time in 2019.
 Gracie Trotter will drive the No. 99, replacing Brittney Zamora, who started the 2020 season without a ride.
 On January 16, 2020, Corey Heim was announced as the driver of Venturini Motorsports' new part-time ARCA West Series team.
 On January 29, 2020, it was announced that Blaine Perkins would be driving full-time for Sunrise Ford Racing in 2020, replacing 2019 rookie of the year and 2nd-place points finisher Jagger Jones as a driver on that team. Perkins was without a ride in any NASCAR or ARCA Series in 2019, and drove full-time for two years (2016 and 2017) in the West Series for Steve Portenga's team before running part-time in the ARCA Menards Series in 2018 for Mason Mitchell's team. Perkins will drive the No. 9, replacing Trevor Huddleston, who moves from the No. 9 to the No. 6 which was Jones' car in 2019.
 On January 31, 2020, it was announced that Lawless Alan, who drove the No. 12 part-time for Bill McAnally Racing last year, would run full-time in the same car this season in addition to the other four drivers the team announced two weeks prior.
 On March 16, 2020, Zamora, who had lost her ride in the McAnally No. 99 to Trotter, tweeted that she would be attempting the race at Irwindale in the No. 42 Ford for Jefferson Racing.

Schedule
On January 6, 2020, NASCAR released the schedule for the 2020 season. As part of the unification of the East and West series with the ARCA Menards Series, the schedule decreased from fourteen races in 2019 to eleven races in 2020. The number of races was originally ten, however, an additional race at Utah Motorsports Campus was announced on March 3, 2020.

As part of the unification of the East and West series with the ARCA Menards Series, the West will participate in the Sioux Chief Showdown, a ten-race series within the main ARCA series featuring drivers from each of the three branches.

In terms of TV, NBC will continue to broadcast the West Series schedule on tape delay as they have in the past.

Schedule changes due to the COVID-19 pandemic
 It was announced that all ARCA (and NASCAR) races would be postponed through May 3, which affects the race at Irwindale, which will need to be run at another time in the season. That race was previously scheduled for March 28. The races at Douglas County, Utah Motorsports Campus, and Colorado would also end up being postponed from their original dates of May 16, May 23, and June 6, respectively.
 The Procore 200 at Sonoma Raceway was cancelled and replaced by a second race at Utah Motorsports Campus which was run as a doubleheader with their other race on the schedule, which was postponed from May 23 to June 27.
 On July 14, 2020, it was announced that the race at Douglas County would be on Saturday, August 8, which was the date of the Evergreen race, which was bumped back one day to Friday, August 7. The two races will be run on back to back days. The tracks are a six-hour drive from each other and teams will travel from Evergreen to Douglas County in the night and morning between the two races. It was also announced that the race at Meridian would not be on August 29 as previously scheduled, and that the race would remain on the schedule but would have a different date later in the year after the month of August. However, the race at Meridian Speedway was later cancelled and replaced with a race at the Las Vegas Motor Speedway Bullring.

Results and standings

Races

Drivers' championship

Note: The pole-winner also receives 1 bonus point, similar to the previous ARCA points system used until 2019 and unlike NASCAR.

(key) Bold – Pole position awarded by time. Italics – Pole position set by final practice results or rainout. * – Most laps led. ** – All laps led.

See also
 2020 NASCAR Cup Series
 2020 NASCAR Xfinity Series
 2020 NASCAR Gander RV & Outdoors Truck Series
 2020 ARCA Menards Series
 2020 ARCA Menards Series East
 2020 NASCAR Whelen Modified Tour
 2020 NASCAR Pinty's Series
 2020 NASCAR Whelen Euro Series
 2020 eNASCAR iRacing Pro Invitational Series
 2020 EuroNASCAR Esports Series

References

ARCA Menards Series
Arca Menards West
Arca Menards West
ARCA Menards Series West